The 2012–13 I-League was the sixth season of the I-League, the Indian professional league for association football clubs, since its establishment in 2007. The season began on 6 October 2012 and finished on 12 May 2013 with Churchill Brothers crowned champions in matchday 25.

Dempo were the defending champions, having won their third I-League title the previous season.

On 29 December 2012, Mohun Bagan were barred from competing in the I-League for 2 years following a decision taken by the I League core committee. This was because they failed to turn up in the second half of the match against East Bengal because of crowd trouble. All their results in the I-League were declared null and void and all their remaining fixtures were cancelled. 	
But on 15 January 2013, Mohun Bagan appealed against the decision to ban them from the league and were reinstated, but would start on 0 points.

Teams
A total of 14 teams contested the league, including 12 sides from the 2011–12 season and two promoted from the 2012 I-League 2nd Division.

ONGC as champions and United Sikkim as runners-up secured direct promotion from the 2012 I-League 2nd Division. ONGC returned to the I-League after a one-year absence, while United Sikkim made their debut in the I-League.

Stadium Changes

Air India and Mumbai FC
Due to the ongoing redevelopment of the Cooperage Ground in Mumbai which is the regular home for Mumbai F.C. and Air India FC in the I-League both clubs will play at the Balewadi Sports Complex in Pune, Maharashtra until it is complete.

ONGC
The newly promoted ONGC F.C. also usually play at the Cooperage Ground in Mumbai but due to the redevelopment the team decided to play at the Ambedkar Stadium in Delhi which is where the main company, ONGC, are based. However it will only be for five home matches.

Goan clubs
The four Goan clubs in the I-League, Churchill Brothers, Dempo, Salgaocar, and Sporting Clube de Goa, usually play their I-League matches at the Fatorda Stadium in Margao. However, due to a major revamp at the stadium in preparation for the 2013 Lusophony Games which will be held in Goa, the Goan home games for the I-League will be played at the Duler Stadium and then the Tilak Maidan Stadium from the end of January.

Stadiums and Locations

Personnel and kits

Note: Flags indicate national team as has been defined under FIFA eligibility rules. Players may hold more than one non-FIFA nationality.

Managerial changes

Foreign players
Restricting the number of foreign players strictly to four per team, including a slot for a player from AFC countries. A team could use three foreign players on the field each game including a least one player from the AFC country.

League table

Results

Statistical leaders

Top scorers

Top Indian Scorers

Hattricks

Notes

References

 
I-League seasons

1
India